This is a list of every Auburn Tigers football team quarterback and the years they participated on the Auburn Tigers football team.

Main starting quarterbacks

1892 to 1894
The following players were the predominant quarters for the Tigers.

1895 to 1921 (incomplete) 

The following quarterbacks were the predominant quarters for the Tigers each season after the establishment of the Southern Intercollegiate Athletic Association until the establishment of the Southern Conference.

1922 to 1932
The following quarterbacks were the predominant quarters for the Tigers each season after the establishment of the Southern Conference until the establishment of the Southeastern Conference.

1933 to present (incomplete)

The following quarterbacks were the predominant quarters for the Tigers each season after the establishment of the Southeastern Conference up to the present day.

References

Auburn Tigers

Auburn Tigers quarterbacks